Hedville is an unincorporated community in Ohio Township, Saline County, Kansas, United States.

Geography
Mulberry Creek flows through the community.  Its elevation is 1,270 feet (387 m), and it is located at  (38.8627816, -97.7614282).

Demographics
As a part of Saline County, Hedville is a part of the Salina, Kansas micropolitan area.

Education
The community is served by Ell–Saline USD 307 public school district.

References

Further reading

External links
 Saline County maps: Current, Historic, KDOT

Unincorporated communities in Saline County, Kansas
Unincorporated communities in Kansas